Stanley Gordon Geldart (June 18, 1919 –   January 23, 1983) was a provincial politician from Alberta, Canada. He served as a member of the Legislative Assembly of Alberta from 1963 to 1967 sitting with the Social Credit caucus in government.

Political career
Geldart ran for a seat in the Alberta Legislature in the 1963 general election. He ran as a Social Credit candidate in the new electoral district of Edmonton West. He defeated three other candidates with 41% of the popular vote.  He retired at dissolution of the assembly in 1967.

References

External links
Legislative Assembly of Alberta Members Listing

Alberta Social Credit Party MLAs
1919 births
1983 deaths